Mordellistena divergens is a beetle in the genus Mordellistena of the family Mordellidae. It was described in 1952 by Ermisch.

References

divergens
Beetles described in 1952